Rečica ob Paki is a village in the Municipality of Šmartno ob Paki in northern Slovenia. It lies on both banks of the Paka River at its confluence with the Savinja south of Šmartno. The area is part of the traditional region of Styria. The municipality is now included in the Savinja Statistical Region.

References

External links
Rečica ob Paki at Geopedia

Populated places in the Municipality of Šmartno ob Paki